Dirk Bielefeldt  (born 1957 in Hamburg) is a German actor and cabaret artist, particularly famous for his role of the policeman, Herr Holm.

Early life
Bielefeldt completed his abitur in 1976 in Gymnasium Eppendorf in Hamburg, before studying sociology and psychology at the University of Hamburg, financing his studies by working for a company which refurbished apartments, but not completing the course.

Bielefeldt then took an acting course with Philippe Gaulier in Paris, and participated in various street theatre groups, where he developed the character Herr Holm.

Career
In 1991, Bielefeldt debuted in the cabaret production Herr Holm – Keiner für alle.

Soon afterwards, Bielefeldt was a partner of Peer Augustinski in the series Comedy Club, mostly playing Herr Holm, but also appearing as the caretaker Mock. The series only ran for a short time, but excerpts from it are still broadcast, adding to the popularity of Bielefeldt and Herr Holm. Bielefeldt also appeared in multiple stage productions, and in 2006 he appeared as a policeman in the film 7 Zwerge – Der Wald ist nicht genug.

Herr Holm's given name is Klaus-Dieter, but he is almost always referred to as Herr Holm.

Since 2009, Bielefeldt plays Herr Holm as a foreman instead of as a policeman in Vorsicht Baustelle!.

Awards
 1991 – ScharfrichterBeil Bavarian cabaret award
 2007 – Honorary superintendent of the Hamburg police

References

External links

 
 Herr Holm Homepage

1957 births
Living people
Male actors from Hamburg
University of Hamburg alumni